Dehla Chattha), is a village on Alipur Chatha  Road, in Wazirabad Tehsil, in the Gujranwala District of Pakistan.

It is situated midway between Gujranwala and Alipur Chatha, 20 km from Gujranwala, 15 km from Alipur Chatha and 3 kilometers from Kalaske Cheema towards Alipur Chatha.

Villages in Gujranwala District